The Business is a Canadian television series, which airs on The Movie Network in Canada and IFC in the United States.

The show centres on Vic Morgan (Rob Deleeuw), an adult film director of a low-budget softcore pornographic series similar to Girls Gone Wild. He attempts to become a legitimate film maker after having converted to Judaism to be successful in the entertainment industry. Season one depicts the production of his first independent film and the difficulties along the way with an undisciplined production staff, poorly skilled actors, and an eccentric Japanese investor. Season two follows the company following the success of its first film as they search for a follow-up project.

The series is filmed and produced in Montreal by Philms Pictures, and has a predominantly Canadian cast.

Characters

Main

Recurring
Kaela Bahrey as Vic's daughter Beatrice Morgenstein.
Matt Silver as Terrence von Holtzen, the freshly promoted Associate Co-head of the Animation and Historical Adaptation Department.
Nobuya Shimamoto as Vic's former brother-in-law and film investor, Kenji Nakamura.
Ellen David as Vic's Flicks brutally honest secretary, Shelley Baker.
Glenda Braganza as new employee Nancy Drake.
Neil Napier as greasy accountant Wendell Cooper.
Sophie Grégoire as Brooke Fairchild.
Claire Brosseau as eccentric interior decorator Rhonda Goldenblatt.
Karen Cliche as Scarlet Saint-James, star of Vic's legitimate indie-thriller.

Episodes

Series overview

Season 1 (2006)

Season 2 (2007)
Premiered Sun, August 5, 2007 @ 11:00pm ET/PT on IFC

Notes
This series airs on IFC in a paired timeslot where The Minor Accomplishments of Jackie Woodman, starring Laura Kightlinger airs in the last half-hour of the hour-long timeslot.

References

External links

2006 Canadian television series debuts
2007 Canadian television series endings
2000s Canadian sitcoms
2006 American television series debuts
2007 American television series endings
2000s American sitcoms
Television shows set in Montreal
IFC (American TV channel) original programming